A660 may refer to:

 A660 road, road in England
  A660 autoroute in France, which connects to the A63 autoroute